Clicks & Cuts Series is a compilation series from the German music label Mille Plateaux. It features various experimental electronic artists to give an example of the sound and variety of the glitch music movement of the early 2000s. So far, six volumes have been released.

The term "clicks & cuts" was first used by an English journalist writing about glitch music and the Mille Plateaux label.

Volumes
 Clicks & Cuts
 Clicks & Cuts 2
 Clicks & Cuts 3
 Clicks & Cuts 4
 Clicks & Cuts 5.0 - Paradigm Shift
 Clicks & Cuts 5.1 - Paradigm Shift (The Bonus Package)

See also
 Mille Plateaux (record label)
 Glitch (music)
 Minimal techno
 Intelligent dance music
 Microhouse

External links
 Official label website

Compilation album series